Osvaldo Antonio Peralta Medina (born 2 February 1971) is a retired football (soccer) defender from Paraguay. He played professional football in Paraguay, Spain and Bolivia during his career.

Peralta made his international debut for the Paraguay national football team on 14 May 1995 in a Copa Paz de Chico match against Bolivia (1-1). He obtained a total number of four international caps, scoring no goals for the national side. He represented Paraguay at the 1992 Summer Olympics in Barcelona, Spain.

External links

1971 births
Living people
Paraguayan footballers
Paraguay international footballers
Paraguayan expatriate footballers
Association football central defenders
Footballers at the 1992 Summer Olympics
Olympic footballers of Paraguay
Expatriate footballers in Spain
Expatriate footballers in Bolivia
1995 Copa América players